The Apostolic Vicariate of Ruanda was created on 25 April 1922 from the northern part of the former Apostolic Vicariate of Kivu, serving the territory of what is now Rwanda. It was led by Bishop Léon-Paul Classe of the White Fathers. The Apostolic Vicariate of Urundi was created on the same date, serving the territory of what is now Burundi and led by Bishop Julien-Louis-Edouard-Marie Gorju.

Bishop Classe died on 31 January 1945 and was succeeded by Bishop Laurent-François Déprimoz. On 14 February 1952 the Apostolic Vicariate of Ruanda was divided into the Apostolic Vicariate of Kabgayi under Bishop Déprimoz and the Apostolic Vicariate of Nyundo under Bishop Aloys Bigirumwami.

References
Citations

Sources

1952 disestablishments
Ruanda
1920s establishments in Ruanda-Urundi
Christian organizations established in 1922
Religious organizations disestablished in 1952